Imanol García de Albéniz Crecente (born 8 June 2000), sometimes known simply as Imanol, is a Spanish footballer who plays as a left back for SD Eibar, on loan from Athletic Bilbao.

Club career
García de Albéniz was born in Gallarta, Biscay, Basque Country, and joined Athletic Bilbao's Lezama in 2010, from hometown side CD Gallarta. He made his senior debut with the farm team on 26 August 2018, starting and scoring his team's second in a 2–2 Tercera División home draw against SD Deusto.

García de Albéniz was promoted to the reserves in Segunda División B ahead of the 2019–20 season, and immediately became a regular starter for the side. He renewed his contract with the Lions until 2025 on 5 March 2021, and moved to Segunda División side CD Mirandés on a one-year loan deal on 1 July.

García de Albéniz made his professional debut on 16 August 2021, starting in a 0–0 away draw against Málaga CF. He scored his first professional goal seven days later, netting his team's second in a 2–0 home win over SD Amorebieta.

On 14 July 2022, García de Albéniz was loaned to SD Eibar in the second division for the season.

References

External links

2000 births
Living people
People from Greater Bilbao
Sportspeople from Biscay
Spanish footballers
Footballers from the Basque Country (autonomous community)
Association football defenders
Segunda División players
Segunda División B players
Tercera División players
CD Basconia footballers
Bilbao Athletic footballers
CD Mirandés footballers
SD Eibar footballers